Pardi is a town in the Indian state of Gujarat.

Pardi may also refer to:
 Pardi, Bhopal, a village in Madhya Pradesh, India
 Pardi, Dahanu, a village in Maharashtra, India
 Pardi, Iran, a village in Iran
 Pardi, Azerbaijan, a village in Azerbaijan
 Jon Pardi, American country music singer
 Leo Pardi (1915–1990), Italian zoologist

See also
Pardy